Levick is a surname. Notable people with the surname include:

Barbara Levick (born 1931), English historian and biographer
Derek Levick (1929–2004), English cricketer
Frank Levick (died 1908), English footballer
George Murray Levick (1876–1956), English explorer
Jemima Levick (born 1977 or 1978), British theatre director
Katie Levick (born 1991), English cricketer
Marsha Levick, American juvenile justice lawyer
Oliver Levick, English footballer

See also

Mount Levick, mountain in Antarctica